The 2006 Boudouaou bombing occurred on August 8, 2006 when an explosive bomb detonated against a patrol of the Algerian police in the town of Boudouaou, Boumerdès Province, Algeria injuring 3. The Al-Qaeda Organization in the Islamic Maghreb is suspected as being responsible.

See also
 Terrorist bombings in Algeria
 List of terrorist incidents, 2006

References

2006 crimes in Algeria
Boumerdès Province
Suicide car and truck bombings in Algeria
Mass murder in 2006
Terrorist incidents in Algeria
Terrorist incidents in Algeria in 2006
2006 murders in Algeria
Islamic terrorism in Algeria